These are the official results of the athletics competition at the 2006 Central American and Caribbean Games which took place on July 25–29, 2006 in Cartagena, Colombia.

Men's results

100 meters

Heats – July 25WindHeat 1: +1.1 m/s, Heat 2: +1.1 m/s, Heat 3: +1.9 m/s, Heat 4: +1.4 m/s

Semifinals – July 25Wind:Heat 1: +2.0 m/s, Heat 2: +1.8 m/s

Final – July 26Wind: +0.6 m/s

200 meters

Heats – July 27Wind:Heat 1: -2.0 m/s, Heat 2: -2.0 m/s, Heat 3: -2.0 m/s, Heat 4: -2.0 m/s

Semifinals – No data available

Final – July 28Wind: +1.1 m/s

400 meters

Heats – July 25

Semifinals – July 25

Final – July 26

800 meters

Heats – July 25

Final – July 27

1500 meters
July 25

5000 meters
July 29

10,000 meters
July 26

Marathon
July 29

110 meters hurdles

Heats – July 25Wind:Heat 1: +0.2 m/s, Heat 2: +2.1 m/s

Final – July 26Wind:+0.7 m/s

400 meters hurdles

Heats – July 26

Final – July 27

3000 meters steeplechase
July 28

4 × 100 meters relay
Heats – July 28

Final – July 29

4 × 400 meters relay
Heats – July 28

Final – July 29

20 kilometers walk
July 25

High jump
July 26

Pole vault
July 29

Long jump
Qualification – July 26

Final – July 28

Triple jump
July 27

Shot put
July 29

1 Dorian Scott originally won the gold medal with 20.34 metres but was later disqualified after he tested positive for cannabis.

Discus throw
July 27

Hammer throw
July 28

Javelin throw
July 25

Decathlon
July 25–26

Women's results

100 meters

Heats – July 25Wind:Heat 1: +3.2 m/s, Heat 2: +1.6 m/s, Heat 3: +2.3 m/s

Final – July 26Wind:+0.5 m/s

200 meters

Heats – July 27Wind:Heat 1: -1.0 m/s, Heat 2: -1.0 m/s, Heat 3: -1.0 m/s

Final – July 27Wind:-0.4 m/s

400 meters

Heats – July 25

Final – July 25

800 meters
July 29

1500 meters
July 25

5000 meters
July 29

Marathon
July 29

100 meters hurdles

Heats – July 25Wind:Heat 1: +2.1 m/s, Heat 2: +2.1 m/s

Final – July 26Wind:+0.4 m/s

400 meters hurdles
July 27

4 × 100 meters relay
July 29

4 × 400 meters relay

20 kilometers walk
July 25

High jump
July 29

Pole vault
July 29

Long jump
July 26

Triple jump
July 29

Shot put
July 27

Discus throw
July 28

Hammer throw
July 27

Javelin throw
July 29

Heptathlon
July 26–27

References
Results

Central American and Caribbean Games
2006